The Hon. Osmund Scott (24 March 1876 – 9 September 1948) was an English cricketer. He played for Gloucestershire in 1905.  Scott was also a golfer; he was runner-up in the 1905 Amateur Championship.

Osmund Scott was the son of John Scott, 3rd Earl of Eldon, and the fifth of seven children.  He attended Winchester College.  Among his siblings were Lady Margaret Scott, an early women's golf champion, and Michael Scott, who won the Amateur Championship in 1933.  He married Mary Cecilia Stuart, and had seven children of his own.

Scott served in World War I between 1916 and 1918 with the Royal Army Service Corps.

Results in major championships
This timeline may be incomplete.

DNP = Did not play

"T" indicates a tie for a place
R256, R128, R64, R32, R16, QF, SF = Round in which player lost in match play
Yellow background for top-10

Team appearances
England–Scotland Amateur Match (representing England): 1902, 1905, 1906

References

1876 births
1948 deaths
English cricketers
English male golfers
Amateur golfers
Gloucestershire cricketers
People educated at Winchester College
Royal Army Service Corps soldiers
People from Wareham, Dorset
Cricketers from Dorset
British Army personnel of World War I